The Intramuros Grand Marian Procession is an annual religious procession that takes place in honor of the Feast of the Immaculate Conception. This event takes place every First Sunday of December at the Plaza de Roma at the facade of the Manila Cathedral in Intramuros, Manila. This event is organized by the Cofradia de la Immaculada Concepcion and the Intramuros Administration. This procession is the largest and grandest of its kind in the country. Over 100 images of the Blessed Virgin Mary participate every year which comes from different parishes and families from all over the country. Some of the images include Our Lady of La Naval de Manila, Our Lady of Porta Vaga of Cavite City, Cavite, Our Lady of Divine Shepherdess of Gapan, Nueva Ecija, Our Lady of Caysasay of Batangas and Our Lady of Aranzazu of San Mateo, Rizal.

2022 
The 2022 Intramuros Grand Marian Procession, the 41st edition, took place Sunday, December 4, 2022, at 3pm in Intramuros, Manila. 45 images of the Blessed Virgin Mary were expected to participate. However, only 42 were present. This year, the line-up changed, it began with the images of St Andrew, St Joseph, and St Anne. Then followed by the Coronadas according to the date they were canonically crowned. A huge decrease in images because of the COVID-19 pandemic which also caused the cancellations of the 2020 & 2021 events.

Debuts - Mary, Help of Christians of Paranaque, Nuestra Señora de la Merced de Novaliches, Mater Dolorosa de Tarlac, La Immaculada Concepcion de Malabon, Nuestra Señora de Salvacion de Joroan, Nuestra Señora de la Candelaria de Jaro

Returns - Nuestra Señora de Guia, Nuestra Señora dela Paz y Buen Viaje, Mahal na Birhen ng Biglang Awa

Withdrawals - Nuestra Señora del Santísimo Rosario — La Virgen de Sapao, Nuestra Señora de los Dolores de Quezon, Nuestra Señora del Pilar de Imus

The list of the images in the order that they were processed. Images in bold indicate images that have joined for the first time. Images in italics indicate images that have returned after a period of time.

 San Andres, Patron de Manila - Intramuros Administration (Intramuros, Manila) 
 San Jose, Patron de la Iglesia Universal - Familia Tengco (Baliuag, Bulacan) 
 Santa Ana y Niña Maria de Hagonoy - National Shrine of Saint Anne (Hagonoy, Bulacan) 
 Nuestra Señora de los Dolores de Turumba - Saint Peter of Alcantara (Pakil, Laguna)
 Nuestra Señora de la Merced de Tarlac - Diocesan Shrine of Nuestra Señora dela Merced (Tarlac City)
 Mary Help of Christians of Parañaque - National Shrine of Mary Help of Christians (Parañaque City)
 Nuestra Señora, Patrocinio de Maria Santísima - Boljo-on Church (Boljo-on, Cebu)
 Nuestra Señora de la Merced de Novaliches - Diocesan Shrine and Parish of Our Lady Of Mercy of Novaliches (Novaliches, Quezon City)
 Mater Dolorosa de Capas - Mater Dolorosa Parish (Capas, Tarlac)
 Nuestra Senora de Lourdes - National Shrine of Our Lady of Lourdes (Quezon City)
 Our Lady of Mt. Carmel of New Manila - National Shrine of Our Lady of Mount Carmel, New Manila, Quezon City
 La Purisima Concepcion - Minor Basilica and Parish of La Purisima Concepcion (Santa Maria, Bulacan)
 Nuestra Senora de la Rosa de Macati - Saints Peter and Paul Parish (Poblacion, Makati City)
 Nuestra Señora de la Soledad de Porta Vaga - San Roque Parish (Cavite City, Cavite)
 Nuestra Senora del Pilar de Morong - Our Lady of the Pillar Parish (Morong, Bataan)
 La Virgen Milagrosa de Badoc, Causa de Nuestra Alegria - Saint John the Baptist Parish (Badoc, Ilocos Norte)
 Nuestra Señora del Pilar de Manila - Our Lady of the Pillar Parish Church (Santa Cruz, Manila)
 Nuestra Señora de Aranzazu de San Mateo - Diocesan Shrine of Our Lady of Aranzazu (San Mateo, Rizal)
 Nuestra Senora del Pilar de Libmanan - Shrine and Parish of Our Lady of the Pillar (San Isidro, Libmanan, Camarines Sur)
 Nuestra Señora de Guadalupe de Cebu - Familia Mendez (Cebu City, Cebu)
 Nuestra Señora de los Desamparados de Mariquina - Our Lady of the Abandoned Parish Church (Marikina City)
 Nuestra Senora del Buen Suceso - Parish of Saint Andrew (La Huerta, Paranaque City)
 Nuestra Senora del Carmen de San Sebastian - Basilica Minore de San Sebastian (Quiapo, Manila)
 Nuestra Señora de los Desamparados de Manila - Our Lady of the Abandoned Parish (Santa Ana, Manila)
 La Inmaculada Concepcion de Malabon - Diocesan Shrine and Parish of the Immaculate Conception (Malabon City)
 Nuestra Señora de Peñafrancia de Manila - Our Lady of Peñafrancia Parish (Paco, Manila)
 Nuestra Señora de la Purificación y la Candelaria de Jaro - National Shrine of Our Lady of Candles (Jaro, Iloilo City)
 Nuestra Senora de Salvacion de Joroan - Our Lady of Salvation Parish and Diocesan Shrine (Joroan, Tiwi, Albay)
 La Divina Pastora - Three Kings Parish (Gapan, Nueva Ecija)
 Nuestra Señora de Namacpacan - Saint Catherine of Alexandria Parish (Luna, La Union)
 Nuestra Señora del Santissimo Rosario del Pueblo de Orani - Our Lady of the Rosary Parish (Orani, Bataan)
 Mahal na Birhen ng Biglang Awa - Diocesan Shrine of Mahal na Birhen ng Biglang Awa (Boac, Marinduque)
 Virgen de los Remedios de Pampanga - Archdiocese of San Fernando (San Fernando, Pampanga)
 Nuestra Senora de Caridad de Bantay - Archdiocesan Shrine of Nuestra Senora de Caridad, Saint Augustine Parish (Bantay, Ilocos Sur)
 Nuestra Senora de Guia - Familia Chua (Intramuros, Manila)
 Nuestra Senora de Caysasay - Familia Orlina (Sampaloc, Manila)
 Nuestra Señora de Visitacion de Piat - Minor Basilica of Our Lady of Piat (Piat, Cagayan)
 Nuestra Señora dela Paz y Buen Viaje - International Shrine of Our Lady of Peace and Good Voyage (Antipolo City, Rizal)
 Nuestra Señora de Peñafrancia de Naga - Peñafrancia Devotees Association (Manila)
 Nuestra Señora del Santisimo Rosario de La Naval de Manila - Familia Cu (Quezon City)
 Nuestra Señora de Consolación y Correa - San Agustin Church (Intramuros, Manila)
 Nuestra Señora de la Inmaculada Concepcion, Mater Purísima - Intramuros Administration (Intramuros, Manila)

2018 
The 2018 Intramuros Grand Marian Procession, the 39th edition, took place Sunday, December 2, 2018, at 4pm in Intramuros, Manila. Over 116 different images of the Blessed Virgin Mary were expected to participate. However only 90 were present, lower than previous year's 96. The line-up returned to its original format beginning with the life of the Blessed Virgin Mary, privately owned Marian Images, Litany of the Blessed Virgin Mary, Veneradas and Coronadas.

For this year, Nuestra Senora del Pilar de Morong in Bataan, which was canonically crowned October 10, 2018 participated for the first time, the only new entry for that year. The image of the Maria Auxiliadora representing the Nation Shrine in Paranaque was represented by the image from Marinduque. Notable returns are the Virgen de la Merced de Candaba, in commemoration of the 800th anniversary of the Mercedarian Order and the Mahal na Birhen ng Biglang Awa of Marinduque.

Debuts - María Auxiliadora delos Cristianos de Boac, Nuestra Señora del Pilar de Morong

Returns - La Bambina Maria, La Anunciación de Virgen María, Santa Maria Madre de Dios, Nuestra Señora de la Merced, Nuestra Senora de Caridad de Bantay

Withdrawals - Mater Dormitio, La Coronacion de la Virgen Maria, Our Mother of Perpetual Help, Nuestra Senora de Montserrat, Nuestra Señora del Santissimo Rosario de Macarena, Virgen dela Inmaculada Corazon de Maria, Nuestra Señora de la Esperanza de Macarena, Mary, Mirror of Justice, Nuestra Senora de la Rosa Mystica, Ina ng Kagalingan ng May Sakit, Santa Maria Degli Angeli, Nuestra Senora de los Angeles, Nuestra Senora del Rosario de Diliman, Nuestra Senora del Pronto Socorro de Binondo, La Reina de Monte Carmelo, Mother of Divine Providence, Nuestra Senora de la Paz y Buen Viaje de Tibag, Nuestra Senora de Guia de Magallanes, Nuestra Senora del Santisimo Rosario de Malabon, Nuestra Senora de la Inmaculada Concepcion de Salambao, Nuestra Senora de Lourdes de Retiro, Nuestra Señora del Pilar de Manila, Nuestra Senora del Pilar de Imus, Nuestra Señora de los Desamparados de Mariquina, Nuestra Señora del Santissimo Rosario del Pueblo de Orani, Nuestra Senora de la Paz y Buen Viaje

The list of the images in the order that they were processed. Images in bold indicate images that have joined for the first time. Images in italics indicate images that have returned after a period of time.

 San Andres, Patron de Manila - Intramuros Administration (Intramuros, Manila)
 San Jose, Patron de la Iglesia Universal - Familia Tengco (Baliuag, Bulacan)
 La Bambina Maria - Parish of Our Lady of Mt. Carmel (Sabang, Baliuag, Bulacan)
 La Niña Maria - Familia Balocating (Quezon City, Metro Manila)
 Santa Ana y Niña Maria de Hagonoy - National Shrine of Saint Anne (Hagonoy, Bulacan)
 La Familia de la Virgen Maria - Familia Gatdula (Tondo, Manila)
 La Anunciación de Virgen María - Familia de Vera (Tondo, Manila)
 Virgin's Divine Matrimony - Familia Castro-Hebron (Muntinlupa, Metro Manila)
 La Visitacion de la Virgen Maria - Familia Miller (Quezon City, Metro Manila)
 Nuestra Señora de la O - Our Lady's Nativity Parish (Pangil, Laguna)
 Nuestra Señora de la Navidad - Familia Villacorta (Makati, Metro Manila)
 Nuestra Señora de la Buena Muerte de Esposa San Jose - Familia Buena (Quezon City)
 Maria Santissima, Madre del Mayor Dolor - Familia Santos (Hagonoy, Bulacan)
 Nuestra Señora de Algeria de Encuentro - Familia Francisco (Valenzuela City, Metro Manila)
 Nuestra Señora de la Asuncion de Bulakan - Our Lady of the Assumption Parish (Bulakan, Bulacan)
 Nuestra Señora de las Flores - Familia Cojuangco (Makati, Metro Manila)
 Nuestra Señora de la Fe - Familia Sedantes (Navotas, Metro Manila)
 Nuestra Señora de los Remedios de Malate - Familia Manlapaz (Santa Ana, Manila)
 Nuestra Señora de Cabra - Familia Santos (Parañaque City, Metro Manila)
 Nuestra Señora de las Estrellas - Familia Pagtakhan (Paco, Manila)
 Nuestra Señora, Estrella del Mar - Familia Estrella (Meycauayan, Bulacan)
 Our Lady of All Nations - Familia Lane (Intramuros, Manila)
 Nuestra Señora de Santisima Nazarena - Familia Diaz (Tondo, Manila)
 Nuestra Señora de la Portería - Heirs of Severina de Asis (San Juan, Metro Manila)
 Nuestra Señora de la Santísima Trinidad - Familia Doctor (Irosin, Sorsogon)
 Nuestra Señora de la Immaculada Corazon de Maria - Familia de Mesa (Gagalangin, Manila)
 La Virgen Dolorosa de Murcia - Familia Manalang (Bocaue, Bulacan)
 Ina Poon Bato - Familia Magsasay (Botolan, Zambales)
 Nuestra Señora de Barangay - Familia Angeles (Santa Mesa, Manila)
 Nuestra Señora del Santissimo Rosario de Manaoag - Familia Estonatoc (Quezon City, Metro Manila)
 Nuestra Señora de Corazon del Niño Jesus. - Familia de los Reyes (Baliuag, Bulacan)
 Nuestra Señora de Salvación - Familia Nell (Quezon City, Metro Manila)
 Virgen de la Victoria - Familia Tengco (Baliuag, Bulacan)
 Mother of Love, Peace, and Joy - La Pieta International Prayer Group (Canada)
 La Pieta - La Pieta International Prayer Group (Canada)
 Our Lady of Lujan - Our Lady of Lujan Parish (Caloocan, Metro Manila)
 Our Lady, Untier of Knots - Familia Linsangan (Bocaue, Bulacan)
 Our Lady of Bannuex - Sisters of Mary School (Silang, Cavite)
 Mary, Mediatrix of All Grace - Mary, Mediatrix of All Grace Parish (Lipa City, Batangas)
 Sancta Maria, Mater Dei - Mater Dei Marriage Encounter Community (Quezon City)
 Santa Maria Madre de Dios - Santo Nino del Pilar Community (Quezon City)
 Madre Divina Gracia de Marilao - Saint Michael the Archangel Parish (Marilao, Bulacan)
 Sancta Maria Virgo Prudentisima - Familia Reyes (Tondo, Manila)
 Maria Santissima, Vaso Digno de Honor - Familia Fesalbon (Paco, Manila)
 Sancta Maria, Stella Matutina - Familia Quiocho (Taytay, Rizal)
 Our Lady, Health of the Sick - Congregation of the Sons of Mary, Health of the Sick (Pasay, Metro Manila)
 Mary, Comforter of the Afflicted - Mary, Comforter of the Afflicted Parish (Pasay, Metro Manila)
 Nuestra Señora, Regina Martyrum - Familia de Leon (Baliuag, Bulacan)
 Maria, Regina Virginum - Familia Cuevas-de Leon (Pateros, Manila)
 Nuestra Señora de los Dolores de Turumba - Saint Peter of Alcantara (Pakil, Laguna)
 Our Lady of Manaoag - Our Lady of Manaoag Chapel (Sampaloc, Manila)
 Our Lady of the Most Holy of Pacita - Santo Rosario Parish (San Pedro, Laguna)
 Nuestra Señora de la Soledad de Manila - Our Lady of Solitude Parish (Binondo, Manila)
 Nuestra Señora, Virgen del Mar Cautiva - Holy Guardian Angels Parish (Santo Tomas, La Union)
 Nuestra Señora de la Salud - Saint Nicholas of Tolentino Parish (Quezon City, Metro Manila)
 La Purisima Concepcion de Santa Maria - La Purisima Concepcion Parish (Santa Maria, Bulacan)
 Our Lady of Hope - Our Lady of Hope Parish (Quezon City, Metro Manila)
 Nuestra Señora de la Soledad de Nueva Ecija - San Isidro Labrador Parish (San Isidro, Nueva Ecija)
 Nuestra Señora del Carmen - Our Lady of Mount Carmel Parish (Quezon City, Metro Manila)
 Our Lady of Loreto de Manila - Archdicoesan Shrine of Our Lady of Loreto (Sampaloc, Manila)
 Nuestra Señora de las Saleras - Diocesan Shrine of Nuestra Senora de las Saleras (Aliaga, Nueva Ecija)
 Nuestra Señora de la Merced - Nuestra Senora de la Merced Parish (Bahay-Pare, Candaba, Pampanga)
 María Auxiliadora delos Cristianos de Boac - Mary Help of Christian Parish, Balimbing, Boac, Marinduque 
 Our Lady of the Visitation of Guibang - National Shrine of Our Lady of the Visitation (Guibang, Gamu, Isabela)
 Nuestra Señora de los Dolores de Quezon - National Shrine of Our Lady of Sorrows (Dolores, Quezon)
 Nuestra Señora de La Salette - National Shrine of Our Lady of La Salette (Silang, Cavite)
 Our Lady of Mt. Carmel of New Manila - National Shrine of Our Lady of Mount Carmel, New Manila, Quezon City
 Our Lady of the Miraculous Medal - National Shrine of Our Lady of the Miraculous Medal (Muntinlupa, Metro Manila)
 Nuestra Señora de Guadalupe - National Shrine of Our Lady of Guadalupe (Makati, Metro Manila)
 Nuestra Señora de Fatima - National Shrine of Our Lady of Fatima (Valenzuela City, Metro Manila)
 Nuestra Señora de la Soledad de Porta Vaga - San Roque Parish (Cavite City, Cavite)
 Nuestra Señora del Pilar de Morong - Our Lady of the Pillar Parish (Morong, Bataan)
 La Virgen Milagrosa de Badoc, Causa de Nuestra Alegria - Saint John the Baptist Parish (Badoc, Ilocos Norte)
 Nuestra Señora de Aranzazu de San Mateo - Diocesan Shrine of Our Lady of Aranzazu (San Mateo, Rizal)
 Nuestra Señora de Guadalupe de Cebu - Familia Mendez (Cebu City, Cebu)
 Nuestra Senora del Buen Suceso - Parish of Saint Andrew (La Huerta, Paranaque City)
 Nuestra Señora de los Desamparados de Manila - Our Lady of the Abandoned Parish (Santa Ana, Manila)
 Nuestra Señora de Peñafrancia de Manila - Our Lady of Peñafrancia Parish (Paco, Manila)
 Mahal na Birhen ng Biglang Awa - Familia Ongsiako-Reyes (Boac, Marinduque)
 Nuestra Señora de Namacpacan - Saint Catherine of Alexandria Parish (Luna, La Union)
 La Divina Pastora - Three Kings Parish (Gapan, Nueva Ecija)
 Virgen de los Remedios de Pampanga - Archdiocese of San Fernando (San Fernando, Pampanga)
 Nuestra Senora de Caridad de Bantay - Archdiocesan Shrine of Nuestra Senora de Caridad, Saint Augustine Parish (Bantay, Ilocos Sur)
 Nuestra Senora de Caysasay - Familia Orlina (Sampaloc, Manila)
 Nuestra Señora de Visitacion de Piat - Minor Basilica of Our Lady of Piat (Piat, Cagayan)
 Nuestra Señora de Peñafrancia de Naga - Peñafrancia Devotees Association (Manila)
 Nuestra Señora del Santisimo Rosario de La Naval de Manila - Familia Cu (Quezon City)
 Nuestra Señora de Consolación y Correa - San Agustin Church (Intramuros, Manila)
 Nuestra Señora de la Inmaculada Concepcion, Mater Purísima - Intramuros Administration (Intramuros, Manila)

2017 
The 2017 Intramuros Grand Marian Procession, the 38th edition of the annual procession, took place at 4 o'clock in the afternoon, on Sunday, December 3, 2017, at the Manila Cathedral in Intramuros, Manila. 96 images of the Blessed Virgin Mary participated in the procession which was lower than previous year's number of 99. This year, a new formatting of the line-up of the procession. It began with the opening images of St Andrew, St Joseph, and St Anne. This was followed by the Veneradas (Marian Images venerated in Churches) were the first one to be paraded followed by the Coronadas, the life of Mary and lastly the privately owned Images.

The image of Mary, Help of Christians was a replica of the original image that was destroyed during the Battle of Marawi that started on May 23, 2017. This image will be donated to St Mary's Cathedral in Marawi. This image will also be remembered when a soldier came and prayed before the image. A picture that went viral on the news and on social media.

Another highlight is the participation of the original image of Our Lady of the Pillar that is venerated at the Santa Cruz Church as part of the preparations for her Canonical Coronation which took place on December 7, 2017.

Debuts - Virgen Milagrosa de Badoc, Our Lady of the Rosary of Pacita, La Purissima Concepcion de Sta. Maria

Returns - La Reina del Monte Carmelo, Nuestra Señora del Santissimo Rosario de Macarena

Withdrawals - St Pedro Calungsod, St Lorenzo Ruiz, La Anunciación de la Virgen, Nuestra Señora de Fatima de Binakayan, Nuestra Señora de la Buena Hora, Nuestra Señora de la Esperanza Macarena, Nuestra Señora de La Paz y Buen Viaje de Tibag, Our Lady of Loreto, Nuestra Señora de Caridad de Bantay

The list of the images in the order that they were processed. Images in bold indicate images that have joined for the first time. Images in italics indicate images that have returned after a period of time.

 San Andres, Patron de Manila - Intramuros Administration (Intramuros, Manila) 
 San Jose, Patron de la Iglesia Universal - Familia Tengco (Baliuag, Bulacan) 
 Santa Ana y Niña Maria de Hagonoy - National Shrine of Saint Anne (Hagonoy, Bulacan) 
 La Reina del Monte Carmelo - Diocesan Shrine of Our Lady of Mount Carmel (Sison, Pangasinan) 
 Nuestra Señora de la O - Our Lady's Nativity Parish (Pangil, Laguna)  
 Nuestra Señora de la Asuncion de Bulakan - Our Lady of the Assumption Parish (Bulakan, Bulacan) 
 La Purisima Concepcion de Santa Maria - La Purisima Concepcion Parish (Santa Maria, Bulacan) 
 Our Lady of the Most Holy of Pacita - Santo Rosario Parish (San Pedro, Laguna) 
 Mother of Divine Providence - Mother of Divine Providence Parish (Quezon City, Metro Manila) 
 Nuestra Señora, Virgen del Mar Cautiva - Holy Guardian Angels Parish (Santo Tomas, La Union) 
 Nuestra Señora de la Salud - Saint Nicholas of Tolentino Parish (Quezon City, Metro Manila) 
 Ina ng Kagalingan ng May Sakit - San Isidro Labrador Parish (Bulakan, Bulacan) 
 Nuestra Señora de la Soledad de Manila - Our Lady of Solitude Parish (Binondo, Manila) 
 Our Lady, Health of the Sick - Congregation of the Sons of Mary, Health of the Sick (Pasay, Metro Manila) 
 Mary, Comforter of the Afflicted - Mary, Comforter of the Afflicted Parish (Pasay, Metro Manila) 
 Our Lady of Bannuex - Sisters of Mary School (Silang, Cavite) 
 Our Lady of Lujan - Our Lady of Lujan Parish (Caloocan, Metro Manila) 
 Virgen de la Rosa de Macati - Saints Peter and Paul Parish (Makati, Metro Manila) 
 Madre Divina Gracia de Marilao - Saint Michael the Archangel Parish (Marilao, Bulacan)
 Our Lady of Hope - Our Lady of Hope Parish (Quezon City, Metro Manila) 
 Nuestra Señora de la Soledad de Nueva Ecija - Saint Isidore The Farmer Parish (San Isidro, Nueva Ecija) 
 Mary, Mediatrix of All Grace - Mary, Mediatrix of All Grace Parish (Lipa City, Batangas) 
 Nuestra Señora del Carmen - Our Lady of Mount Carmel Parish (Quezon City, Metro Manila) 
 Nuestra Señora de la Soledad de Porta Vaga - San Roque Parish (Cavite City, Cavite) 
 Mary, Mirror of Justice - Mary, Mirror of Justice Parish (Makati, Makati) 
 La Virgen Milagrosa de Badoc, Causa de Nuestra Alegria - Saint John the Baptist Parish (Badoc, Ilocos Norte)  
 Maria Auxiliadora de los Cristianos de Marawi - National Shrine of Mary Help of Christians (Parañaque City, Metro Manila) 
 Nuestra Señora de los Dolores - National Shrine of Our Lady of Sorrows (Dolores, Quezon) 
 Nuestra Señora de las Saleras - Diocesan Shrine of Nuestra Senora de las Saleras (Aliaga, Nueva Ecija) 
 Our Lady of Mt. Carmel of New Manila - National Shrine of Our Lady of Mount Carmel, New Manila, Quezon City
 Our Lady of the Visitation of Guibang - National Shrine of Our Lady of the Visitation (Guibang, Gamu, Isabela) 
 Our Lady of La Salette - National Shrine of Our Lady of La Salette (Silang, Cavite) 
 Our Lady of the Miraculous Medal - National Shrine of Our Lady of the Miraculous Medal (Muntinlupa, Metro Manila) 
 Nuestra Señora de Guadalupe - National Shrine of Our Lady of Guadalupe (Makati, Metro Manila) 
 Nuestra Señora de Fatima - National Shrine of Our Lady of Fatima (Valenzuela City, Metro Manila)
 Nuestra Señora de Lourdes de Retiro - National Shrine of Our Lady of Lourdes (Quezon City, Metro Manila) 
 Nuestra Señora de los Dolores de Turumba - Saint Peter of Alcantara (Pakil, Laguna) 
 Nuestra Señora del Pilar de Manila - Our Lady of the Pillar Parish Church (Santa Cruz, Manila) 
 Nuestra Señora de Aranzazu de San Mateo - Diocesan Shrine of Our Lady of Aranzazu (San Mateo, Rizal) 
 Nuestra Señora del Pilar de Imus - Cathedral of Our Lady of the Pillar (Imus, Cavite) 
 Nuestra Señora de Guadalupe de Cebu - Familia Mendez (Cebu City, Cebu) 
 Nuestra Señora del Buen Suceso de Palanyag - Cathedral of Saint Andrew (Parañaque City, Metro Manila) 
 Nuestra Señora de los Desamparados de Manila - Our Lady of the Abandoned Parish (Santa Ana, Manila) 
 Nuestra Señora de Peñafrancia de Manila - Our Lady of Peñafrancia Parish (Paco, Manila) 
 Nuestra Señora de Namacpacan - Saint Catherine of Alexandria Parish (Luna, La Union) 
 La Divina Pastora - Three Kings Parish (Gapan, Nueva Ecija) 
 Nuestra Señora del Santissimo Rosario del Pueblo de Orani - Our Lady of the Rosary Parish (Orani, Bataan) 
 Virgen de los Remedios de Pampanga - Archdiocese of San Fernando (San Fernando, Pampanga) 
 Nuestra Señora de Caysasay - Archdiocesan Shrine of Our Lady of Caysasay (Taal, Batangas) 
 Nuestra Señora de Visitacion de Piat - Minor Basilica of Our Lady of Piat (Piat, Cagayan) 
 Nuestra Señora de Peñafrancia de Naga - Peñafrancia Devotees Association (Manila) 
 Nuestra Señora del Santissimo Rosario de La Naval de Manila - Familia Aliño (Quezon City, Metro Manila) 
 Nuestra Señora de Consolación y Correa - San Agustin Church (Intramuros, Manila) 
 La Niña Maria - Familia Balocating (Quezon City, Metro Manila) 
 La Familia de la Virgen Maria - Familia Gatdula (Tondo, Manila) 
 Virgin's Divine Matrimony - Familia Castro-Hebron (Muntinlupa, Metro Manila) 
 La Visitacion de la Virgen Maria - Familia Miller (Quezon City, Metro Manila) 
 Nuestra Señora de la Natividad - Familia Villacorta (Makati, Metro Manila) 
 Nuestra Señora de la Buena Muerte - Familia Buena (Quezon City) 
 Maria Santissima, Madre del Mayor Dolor - Familia Santos (Hagonoy, Bulacan) 
 Nuestra Señora de Nazarena - Familia Diaz (Tondo, Manila) 
 Nuestra Señora de Algeria de Encuentro - Familia Francisco (Valenzuela City, Metro Manila) 
 Virgen de la Victoria - Familia Tengco (Baliuag, Bulacan) 
 Nuestra Señora de las Flores - Familia Cojuangco (Makati, Metro Manila) 
 Mother of Love, Peace, and Joy - La Pieta International Prayer Group (Canada) 
 La Pieta - La Pieta International Prayer Group (Canada) 
 Nuestra Señora de la Fe - Familia Sedantes (Navotas, Metro Manila) 
 Nuestra Señora de los Remedios de Malate - Familia Manlapaz (Santa Ana, Manila) 
 Nuestra Señora de Cabra - Familia Santos (Parañaque City, Metro Manila) 
 La Virgen Dolorosa de Murcia - Familia Manalang (Bocaue, Bulacan) 
 Nuestra Señora, Estrella del Mar - Familia Estrella (Meycauayan, Bulacan) 
 Our Lady of All Nations - Familia Lane (Intramuros, Manila) 
 Nuestra Señora de la Portería - Heirs of Severina de Asis (San Juan, Metro Manila) 
 Nuestra Señora de la Santísima Trinidad - Familia Doctor (Irosin, Sorsogon) 
 Nuestra Señora de la Immaculada Corazon de Maria - Familia de Mesa (Gagalangin, Manila)  
 Ina Poon Bato - Familia Magsasay (Botolan, Zambales) 
 Our Lady, Untier of Knots - Familia Linsangan (Bocaue, Bulacan)
 Sancta Maria, Mater Dei - Mater Dei Marriage Encounter Community (Quezon City) 
 Sancta Maria Virgo Prudentisima - Familia Reyes (Tondo, Manila) 
 Maria Santissima, Vaso Digno de Honor - Familia Fesalbon (Paco, Manila) 
 Nuestra Señora de la Rosa Mystica - Familia de Jesus (Pasig, Metro Manila) 
 Sancta Maria, Stella Matutina - Familia Quiocho (Taytay, Rizal) 
 Santa Maria Degli Angeli - Saint Francis of Assisi College System (Las Piñas, Metro Manila) 
 Nuestra Señora, Regina Martyrum - Familia de Leon (Baliuag, Bulacan) 
 Maria, Regina Virginum - Familia Cuevas-de Leon (Pateros, Manila)
 Nuestra Señora del Santissimo Rosario de Macarena - Familia Azares (Caloocan, Metro Manila) 
 Our Mother of Perpetual Help - Familia Patinio (Pasay, Metro Manila) 
 Nuestra Señora de las Estrellas - Familia Pagtakhan (Paco, Manila) 
 Nuestra Señora de Barangay - Familia Angeles (Santa Mesa, Manila) 
 Nuestra Señora del Santissimo Rosario de Manaoag - Familia Estonatoc (Quezon City, Metro Manila) 
 Nuestra Señora de Salvación - Familia Nell (Quezon City, Metro Manila) 
 Nuestra Señora de Corazon del Niño Jesus. - Familia de los Reyes (Baliuag, Bulacan) 
 Nuestra Señora de Montserrat - Familia Ancheta (Mapandan, Pangasinan) 
 Virgen dela Inmaculada Corazon de Maria - Familia Pineda (San Juan, Metro Manila) 
 Our Lady of Manaoag - Our Lady of Manaoag Chapel (Sampaloc, Manila) 
 Nuestra Señora de la Inmaculada Concepcion, Mater Purísima - Intramuros Administration (Intramuros, Manila)

References

Christian Sunday observances
Culture in Manila
Catholic Church in the Philippines